Daventry Country Park is a  Local Nature Reserve and country park on the north-eastern outskirts of Daventry in Northamptonshire, England. It is owned and managed by West Northamptonshire Council.

The park centres on Daventry Reservoir, which feeds the Grand Union Canal, and there are also meadows and crack willow woodland. Birds include yellowhammers, lesser whitethroats, dunnocks and song thrushes.

Facilities include a bird hide, a nature trail, an adventure playground, and a cafe.

References

External links
The Friends of Daventry Country Park

Country parks in Northamptonshire
Local Nature Reserves in Northamptonshire
Daventry